Elena Medel (Córdoba, 1985) is a Spanish poet. She lives in Madrid.

Life 
She is the editorial director of La Bella Varsovia, a publishing house centered on poetry.

She has published the poetry books Mi primer bikini (2002; translated into English by Lizzie Davis, My First Bikini, 2015), Tara (2006) and Chatterton (Loewe Young Poets Prize, 2014) and the chapbooks Vacaciones (2004) and Un soplo en el corazón (2007); she is also the author of El mundo mago (2015), an essay about Antonio Machado. Medel has reunited her poems in the volume Un día negro en una casa de mentira (2015), and she has been translated into a dozen of languages.

Works

Books of poetry
 Mi primer bikini (Premio Andalucía Joven 2001; Barcelona, DVD, 2002). 64 pages 
 Vacaciones (Almería, El Gaviero, 2004). 32 pages, .
 Tara (Barcelona, DVD, 2006). 80 pages, .

Criticism
 Todo un placer: antología de relatos eróticos femeninos (Córdoba, Berenice, 2005). 187 pages, .
 Epílogo de Blues Castellano, de Antonio Gamoneda (Madrid, Bartleby, 2007). 81 pages, .

References

External links
 Página web de Elena Medel
 Poemas de Elena Medel
 Elena Medel en el suplemento Tentaciones de El País
 Reseña sobre Vacaciones en Minotauro digital
 Reseña sobre Tara en el suplemento El Cultural de El Mundo
 Reseña sobre Tara en el suplemento Babelia de El País

1985 births
Living people
People from Córdoba, Spain
21st-century Spanish women writers
21st-century Spanish poets
Spanish women poets
Writers from Andalusia